The 2013 Sydney Darts Masters was the inaugural staging of the tournament by the Professional Darts Corporation, as a second entry in the new World Series of Darts after the 2013 Dubai Duty Free Darts Masters. The tournament featured the top eight players according to the Order of Merit and eight qualifiers competing in a knockout system.

Phil Taylor won the event by defeating Michael van Gerwen 10–3 in the final.

Prize money
The total prize fund was £73,000.

Qualifiers
The top eight of the PDC Order of Merit in June 2013 qualified for the event. These were:

  Phil Taylor (winner)
  Michael van Gerwen (runner-up)
  Adrian Lewis (semi-finals)
  James Wade (withdrew)  Simon Whitlock (semi-finals)
  Andy Hamilton (quarter-finals)
  Wes Newton (quarter-finals)
  Raymond van Barneveld (first round)
  Paul Nicholson (quarter-finals)

James Wade was suspended by the PDC for bringing the game into disrepute and was replaced by world number 19 and Australian World Cup player Paul Nicholson. Nicholson was already entered into the tournament as he received a DPA invitation but he was now the number eight seed. An additional place was therefore on offer to the leading non-qualified player from the Oceanic Masters.

The regional qualifiers are:

Draw

Broadcasting 
This event was shown live in the United Kingdom and Europe by Eurosport.

References

Sydney Darts Masters
Sydney Darts Masters
Sports competitions in Sydney
World Series of Darts